Tuileagna Ó Maoil Chonaire (fl. 1585) was an Irish poet.

A member of the Ó Maolconaire bardic family of Connacht, Tuileagna is known from a number of extant works, including Labhram ar iongnaibh Éireann, addressed to Sir Nicholas Walsh, Chief Justice of the Common Pleas and previously Speaker of the third Irish Parliament convened in the reign of Queen Elizabeth I, (Perrott's parliament) of 1585–6. It relates the Middle Irish story of the judgement of King Niall Frossach of Ailech (died 778) concerning a young woman and her fatherless child.

The only manuscript in which it survives is Royal Irish Academy 23 L 17 (RIA 3). Two copies of the Middle Irish text that have survived, from Leabhar Mór Leacain and Liber Flavus Fergusiorum.

See also

 Ollamh Síl Muireadaigh
 23 N 10
 John Fergus (scholar), died c. 1761, hereditary keeper of Liber Flavus Fergusiorum
 Flaithri Ó Maolconaire

References

 Filí agus filidheacht Chonnacht, Tomás Ó Raghallaigh, Dublin, 1938
 * Dictionary of Irish Biography: From the Earliest Times to the Year 2002, nine volumes, eds. James McGuire and James Quinn, Cambridge, 2009. 
 http://www.ria.ie/RIA/files/e5/e526bd92-5bee-4284-90eb-5127a00796cd.pdf
 http://www.ria.ie/Publications/Journals/Eriu/Online-access/58-%282008%29.aspx

Irish-language poets
People from County Roscommon
16th-century Irish poets
Irish male poets
16th-century Irish historians